Houghia is a genus of flies in the family Tachinidae.

Species

H. baccharis Reinhard, 1922 was moved to Microsillus (now a synonym of Siphosturmia).

References

External links
Images at BOLD
DNA Barcode sequences for Houghia species from Costa Rica BOLD

Exoristinae
Diptera of North America
Diptera of South America
Tachinidae genera
Taxa named by Daniel William Coquillett